The men's team competition was a gymnastics event contested as part of the Gymnastics at the 1964 Summer Olympics programme at the Tokyo Metropolitan Gymnasium.

Medalists

Results

The score for the team was a sum of its 6 members best scores.  In each of the 6 apparatuses, the top 5 scores in each category (compulsory and optional) were summed, for a total of 12 categories.  600 points were possible.

Sources

 

Gymnastics at the 1964 Summer Olympics
Men's events at the 1964 Summer Olympics